William Chisholm (October 15, 1788 – May 4, 1842) was a farmer, businessman and political figure in Upper Canada.

He was born in Jordan Bay, Nova Scotia in 1788, the son of a Scottish immigrant and United Empire Loyalist who originally settled in Tryon County, New York. The family moved to Upper Canada and settled near the current site of the city of Hamilton. William served in the York militia during the War of 1812 and became colonel in 1831. He settled in Nelson Township in 1816.

In 1820, Chisholm was elected to the Legislative Assembly of Upper Canada for Halton. He was originally a Reformer and opposed the expulsion of Barnabas Bidwell from the assembly. He had supported Robert Gourlay, and he acted as an agent for William Lyon Mackenzie's newspaper, the Colonial Advocate. He had opened a general store and later also ran an inn; he also was a lumber merchant. In 1825, he was named postmaster for Nelson Township. By 1826, he had a change of heart politically, and by 1837, he helped put down the revolt at Montgomery's Tavern during the Upper Canada Rebellion.

In 1827, Chisholm purchased a large land reserve formerly held for the Mississaugas; he began planning the town of Oakville and set up a shipyard and harbour there. He was appointed justice of the peace in the Gore District in 1829. He was reelected in Halton in 1830 and 1836. In the town of Oakville, Chisholm owned the first tavern, sawmill and grist mill and served as postmaster and customs collector there. He died at Oakville in 1842.

His sons continued to be prominent in the town of Oakville: 
George King became the town's first mayor in 1857.
Robert Kerr later served as postmaster and customs collector at Oakville, and also served a term as mayor in 1866.

External links 
Biography at the Dictionary of Canadian Biography Online
Founders of Oakville

1788 births
1842 deaths
Members of the Legislative Assembly of Upper Canada
People from Oakville, Ontario
Canadian people of the War of 1812
Canadian people of Scottish descent
Canadian justices of the peace